The Kedaka River is a river flowing through Kundapur and Gangolli in western India. It joins with the Souparnika River, Varahi River, Chakra River, and Kubja River and merges into the Arabian Sea.

Rivers of Karnataka
Geography of Udupi district
Rivers of India